The Bern S-Bahn is an S-Bahn commuter rail network focused on Bern, the capital city of Switzerland.  The network is roughly coterminous with Bern's urban agglomeration.

With approximately 9 million train kilometres per year, the Bern S-Bahn is the second-largest S-Bahn in Switzerland.  It handles around 100,000 passengers daily (175,000 on weekdays), and thus carries the majority of the agglomeration's regional public transport traffic.

History
As early as 1974,  (VBW), forerunner of Regionalverkehr Bern-Solothurn (RBS), began operating S-Bahn-style clock-face schedule services in the Bern area.

At this time the "S"-style designations were introduced to differentiate the lines.

The next expansion occurred in 1998, with the commissioning of the S3 (Biel/Bienne−) and the S4 (Bern–− and beyond). Also introduced was the S55 for services from Bern to  via .

2005 
The December 2004 timetable change saw major expansions of the Bern S-Bahn concept. This was partly enabled by infrastructure improvements carried out under the Rail 2000 program. The three RBS lines were formally incorporated into the network, SBB transferred the operation of the S1 and S3 to the Bern-Lötschberg-Simplon-Bahn (BLS).  The network now consisted of the following services:

2009 
The December 2008 timetable change saw several major alterations to the standard gauge part of the network. The S2's western terminus was changed from Schwarzenburg to Laupen BE. On the Bern–Schwarzenburg railway line, the new S6 replaced the S2 and S22, offering a half-hourly service between Schwarzenburg and Bern. The S4 and S44 were re-routed over the Bern–Belp–Thun line to Thun via Belp, in place of the S33.

2010–2012 
The December 2009 timetable change saw a limited number of changes. The most significant involved the S4 and S44.

Operations
The Bern S-Bahn Bern is operated, under a joint commission from the Canton of Bern, its neighbouring cantons and the Federal Government, by the following railway companies:

 BLS AG (BLS);
 Regionalverkehr Bern-Solothurn (RBS).

Upon the timetable change on 12 December 2004, the Swiss Federal Railways (SBB-CFF-FFS) withdrew from its previous involvement in the operation of the Bern S-Bahn, but also took over all of the long-distance services previously operated by the BLS.

Lines
, the network consists of the following lines.

Network map

Rolling stock 
The normal rolling stock rosters for the Bern S-Bahn are:
  BLS RABe 515 ("MUTZ"): up to two units per train (2 x 4- double-decker car EMU).
   ("NPZ") with two "" intermediate cars.
  BLS RABe 515 ("MUTZ"): up to two units per train (2 x 4- double-decker car EMU).
  BLS RABe 515 ("MUTZ"): up to two units per train (2 x 4- double-decker car EMU).
  BLS RABe 525 ("NINA"): 1-2 units per train (4 cars EMU).
  BLS RABe 525 ("NINA"): 1–3 units per train (3 cars EMU).
  BLS RABe 515 ("MUTZ")
  BLS RBDe 565 or RBDe 566 II
  BLS RABe 515 ("MUTZ")
   ("Worbla"): in peak times 2 x Be 4/10,
  supplementary trains Bern–Bolligen RBS Be 4/10 ("Worbla")
  RBS Be 4/12 ("Seconda"): 2 EMU per train.
  RBS Be 4/12 ("Seconda") or RBS Be 4/10 ("Worbla")

See also
Trams in Bern
Trolleybuses in Bern

Notes

Footnotes

References

External links

 

S-Bahn in Switzerland
S-Bahn